Oberkrämer is a municipality in the Oberhavel district, in Brandenburg, Germany.
An experimental farm of wind turbines existed between 1941 and 1945 on the 50 m high Matthias mountain in the area.

Subdivisions

Oberkrämer consists of formerly separate municipalities, which as of 31 December 2001 merged with the new municipality of Oberkrämer. 

On 27 September 1998, the municipalities of Eichstädt, Neu-Vehlefanz and Vehlefanz merged into the new municipality of Oberkrämer. On 31 December 2001, the municipalities of Bärenklau, Bötzow, Marwitz and Schwante were merged into the municipality of Oberkrämer.

Demography

Photogallery

References

External links

Localities in Oberhavel